The 1992–93 Chattanooga Mocs basketball team represented the University of Tennessee at Chattanooga as a member of the Southern Conference during the 1992–93 NCAA Division I men's basketball season. Their head coach was Mack McCarthy and the team played their home games at the UTC Arena. After finishing atop the conference regular season standings, the Mocs won the SoCon tournament, earning an automatic bid to the 1993 NCAA tournament. Chattanooga was beaten in the opening round by No. 5 seed and Wake Forest, 81–58.

Roster

Source:

Schedule and results

|-
!colspan=9 style=| Regular season

|-
!colspan=9 style=| SoCon tournament

|-
!colspan=9 style=| NCAA tournament

Source:

References

Chattanooga Mocs
Chattanooga Mocs men's basketball seasons
Chattanooga Mocs
Chattanooga Mocs
Chattanooga Mocs